Reynolds v. Sims, 377 U.S. 533 (1964), was a landmark United States Supreme Court case in which the Court ruled that the electoral districts of state legislative chambers must be roughly equal in population. Along with Baker v. Carr (1962) and Wesberry v. Sanders (1964), it was part of a series of Warren Court cases that applied the principle of "one person, one vote" to U.S. legislative bodies.

Prior to the case, numerous state legislative chambers had districts containing unequal populations; for example, in the Nevada Senate, the smallest district had 568 people, while the largest had approximately 127,000 people. Some states refused to engage in regular redistricting, while others enshrined county by county representation (Like the federal government does with state by state representation) in their constitutions. The case of Reynolds v. Sims arose after voters in Birmingham, Alabama, challenged the apportionment of the Alabama Legislature; the Constitution of Alabama provided for one state senator per county regardless of population differences.

In a majority opinion joined by five other justices, Chief Justice Earl Warren ruled that the Fourteenth Amendment's Equal Protection Clause requires states to establish state legislative electoral districts roughly equal in population. Warren held that "legislators represent people, not trees or acres. Legislators are elected by voters, not farms or cities or economic interests." In his dissenting opinion, Associate Justice John Marshall Harlan II argued that the Equal Protection Clause was not designed to apply to voting rights. The decision had a major impact on state legislatures, as many states had to change their system of representation.

Reynolds is frequently ranked as one of the greatest Supreme Court decisions of the modern era.

Historical background
Before the industrialization and urbanization of the United States, a State Senate was understood to represent rural counties, as a counterbalance to towns and cities. State legislatures had been reluctant to redistrict because there existed general upper-class fear that if redistricting to meet population changes were carried out, voters in large, expanding or expanded urban areas would vote for confiscatory wealth redistribution that would severely inhibit the power of business interests who controlled state and city governments early in the century. Of the forty-eight states then in the Union, only seven twice redistricted even one chamber of their legislature following both the 1930 and the 1940 Censuses. Illinois did not redistrict between 1910 and 1955, while Alabama and Tennessee had at the time of Reynolds not redistricted since 1901. In Connecticut, Vermont, Mississippi, and Delaware, apportionment was fixed by the states' constitutions, which, when written in the late eighteenth or nineteenth centuries, did not foresee  the possibility of rural depopulation as was to occur during the first half of the century.  In New Hampshire the state constitutions, since January 1776, had always called for the state senate to be apportioned based on taxes paid, rather than on population.

Having already overturned its ruling that redistricting was a purely political question in Baker v. Carr, 369 U.S. 186 (1962), the Court ruled to correct what it considered egregious examples of malapportionment; these were serious enough to undermine the premises underlying republican government. Before Reynolds, urban counties nationwide often had total representations similar to rural counties, and in Florida, there was a limit to three representatives even for the most populous counties.

The case

Voters from Jefferson County, Alabama, home to the state's largest city of Birmingham, challenged the apportionment of the Alabama Legislature. The Alabama Constitution provided that there be only one state senator per county. Ratio variances as great as 41 to 1 from one senatorial district to another existed in the Alabama Senate (i.e., the number of eligible voters voting for one senator was in one case 41 times the number of voters in another). The case was named for M. O. Sims, one of the voters who brought the suit, and B. A. Reynolds, a probate judge in Dallas County, one of the named defendants in the original suit. Reynolds was named (along with three other probate judges) as a symbolic representative of all probate judges in the state of Alabama.

Among the more extreme pre-Reynolds disparities claimed by Morris K. Udall:

 In the Connecticut General Assembly, one House district had 191 people.
 In the New Hampshire General Court, the Town of Ellsworth with a population of three people had a Representative in the lower house; this was the same representation given to Bedford, with a population of 3,636.
 In the Utah State Legislature, the smallest district had 165 people, the largest 32,380.
 In the Vermont General Assembly, the smallest district had 36 people, the largest 35,000.
 In the Idaho Senate, the smallest district had 969 people; the largest, 93,400.
 In the Nevada Senate, seventeen members represented as many as 127,000 or as few as 568 people.

Decision

The eight justices who struck down state senate inequality based their decision on the principle of "one person, one vote." In his majority decision, Chief Justice Earl Warren said "Legislators represent people, not trees or acres. Legislators are elected by voters, not farms or cities or economic interests." In addition, the majority simply denied the argument that states were permitted to base their apportionment structures upon the Constitution itself, which requires two senators from each state despite substantially unequal populations among the states.

Justice Tom C. Clark wrote a concurring opinion. Justice Potter Stewart also issued a concurring opinion, in which he argued that while many of the schemes of representation before the court in the case were egregiously undemocratic and clearly violative of equal protection, it was not for the Court to provide any guideline beyond general reasonableness for apportionment of districts.

In dissent, Justice John Marshall Harlan II wrote that the majority had chosen to ignore the language, history, and original intent of the Equal Protection Clause, which did not extend to voting rights. The dissent strongly accused the Court of repeatedly amending the Constitution through its opinions, rather than waiting for the lawful amendment process: "the Court's action now bringing them (state legislative apportionments) within the purview of the Fourteenth Amendment amounts to nothing less than an exercise of the amending power by this Court." The Court had already extended "one person, one vote" to all U.S. congressional districts in Wesberry v. Sanders (1964) a month before, but not to the Senate.

Aftermath
Since the ruling applied different representation rules to the states than was applicable to the federal government, Reynolds v. Sims set off a legislative firestorm across the country. Senator Everett Dirksen of Illinois led a fight to pass a constitutional amendment allowing legislative districts based on land area, similar to the United States Senate. He warned that:

Numerous states had to change their system of representation in the state legislature.  For instance, South Carolina had elected one state senator from each county.  It devised a reapportionment plan and passed an amendment providing for home rule to counties. However, allegations of State Senates being redundant arose, as all states affected retained their state senates, with state senators being elected from single-member districts, rather than abolishing the upper houses, as had been done in 1936 in Nebraska (and in the provinces of Canada), or switching to electing state senators by proportional representation from several large multi-member districts or from one statewide at-large district, as was done in Australia.

Reactions

In a 2015 Time Magazine survey of over 50 law professors, both Erwin Chemerinsky (Dean, UC Berkeley School of Law) and Richard Pildes (NYU School of Law) named Reynolds v. Sims the "best Supreme Court decision since 1960", with Chemerinsky noting that in his opinion, the decision made American government "far more democratic and representative."

See also
 The Shaff Plan
Alabama Legislative Black Caucus v. Alabama, 
 List of United States Supreme Court cases, volume 377

References

Notes

External links
 
California Legislative District Maps (1911–Present)

United States equal protection case law
United States Supreme Court cases
United States electoral redistricting case law
United States One Person, One Vote Legal Doctrine
1964 in United States case law
American Civil Liberties Union litigation
Jefferson County, Alabama
Alabama Legislature
United States Supreme Court cases of the Warren Court
Legal history of Alabama
Civil rights movement case law